List of fish encountered in Swedish waters; both fresh water (lakes and streams) and in the marine salt water.

The table denotes species native to Sweden, as well as those introduced from a neighbouring country and those that have only occurred occasionally. There are approximately 140 species which are native and common in Sweden, plus another 90 which are sporadic, not established or extinct.

The IUCN Red List is a set of certain criteria of the fish population status in Sweden. The following terminology is used: extinct, critically endangered, endangered,  vulnerable, near threatened, least concern, disappeared, data deficient and not evaluated.

List

Owens
The Aulopiformes, or grinners, are marine fish, most of which live in deep-sea waters in the Atlantic. Only sporadically encountered in Swedish waters, e.g. the Magnisudis atlantica has to date been found eight times, the first in 1960 and the last in 1978.

swedish fish

Acipenseriformes (sturgeon-like fish)
The Acipenseriformes are an order of primitive ray-finned fishes that includes the sturgeons and paddlefishes. There have been occasional finds in Swedish waters. Some species, such as the Beluga sturgeon are heavily desired for its roe, or caviar.

Some species of sturgeons are known to have populated Swedish waters in the 19th century along the coast lines of the Baltic Sea and in some inland streams. The population has now probably disappeared, and the red list denotes it as disappeared (RE). Stuffed specimens are commons in museums.

Anguilliformes (eel fish)
The European eel (Anguilla anguilla) in Swedish waters has radically diminished in the latest decades, and is now listed as critically endangered. The population is estimations to be 1–10% of that in the 1970s. Eels are sensitive of environmental pollution, but the fishing of eel have also increased, especially in French waters. As eels migrate long distances, overfishing and pollution in one location may radically endanger the population and little is known of all possible causes for the diminishing population.

The eel is a popular dish, especially in southern Sweden, and is economically of importance with catches of around 1,000 tonnes (1,200 in 1983). It is prepared by being smoked.

Carcharhiniformes (ground sharks)
The order Carcharhiniformes, or ground sharks, are the largest order of sharks and include many well-known types such as the blue shark and the sandbar shark.

Beryciformes
The Beryciformes are an order of ray-finned fishes. They live solely in the marine, in deep-waters usually in tropical areas, and are only sporadically seen in Nordic waters.

Beloniformes
The Beloniformes are an order of "horned" fishes. The most notable species here is the garfish (Belone belone) which swims in large shoals during the summer along the coasts of south and west Sweden, and caught for food or sport. The total catch during 1983 was 44 tonnes.

Batrachoidiformes
The order Batrachoidiformes, or toadfish, are a type of ray-finned fish normally found on the sand and mud bottoms of coastal waters worldwide. The only example of a fish from this order caught in Swedish water was a specimens of the Halobatrachus didactylus—a fish native to the coasts of Africa—caught by the shore of southern Sweden in 1820 (specimens preserved).

Chimaeriformes (ghost sharks)
The order Chimaeriformes is common in tropical waters. The only species found in Swedish water is the Chimaera monstrosa which is somewhat common in the westernmost waters of Sweden, the Skagerrak. This fish is unsuitable as a food fish, but its large liver is used to produce a lubricant.

Clupeiformes (herring-like fish)
Clupeiformes is the order of ray-finned fish that includes the herring family, Clupeidae, and the anchovy family, Engraulidae.

The herring is common around the coasts of Sweden where it is periodically the most commons fish—the population in the shoals fluctuates greatly every year. The herring has been of historical importance for Swedish economy and indeed for food since the Middle Ages. It is still today the economically most important Swedish fish. The total catch of herring in Swedish waters in 1996 was 132,153 tonnes, of which 74,293 tonnes became fish meal and 57,860 tonnes was sold to consumers.

The Swedes have two names for herring, sill or strömming, depending on where they have been caught, west or east of the island of Bornholm.

The herring is also an important part of the Swedish cuisine. It is served pickled both at Christmas and at Midsummer, and in northern Sweden the fermented herring is popular treat.

Shoals of anchovies are denoted as native and commons, but the anchovy is primarily native to southern Europe, and the shoals in Nordic waters varies between years. As such, fishing of it is not systematical.

A third economically important fish of this order is the European sprat (Sprattus sprattus). The total catch in Swedish waters in 1996 was 168,582 tonnes. It is often flavoured and put in cans labeled as anchovy, which is incorrect from a zoological point of view, but fairly accurate in terms of usage. This pickled "anchovy" is a main ingredient of the Swedish traditional dish Janssons frestelse.

Cypriniformes
The order Cypriniformes consists of several families of carp-like fishes, the most important being the cyprinids—the carps and minnows.

The carp bream (Abramis brama), the largest of the breams, is of note in Swedish fresh waters. Once an important source of food (which is still the case in parts of Europe), it is today only of economical importance in Sweden's southern parts (Skåne, etc.). However it is still common in other waters in Sweden, where it is a popular game fish.

Esociformes (pike fish)
There is only one fish of the Esox family in Europe: the Esox lucius, epox, also known as northern pike. This fish is common in lakes in the whole of Sweden, with the exceptions of the northernmost regions where it is only sporadic.

Commercial fishing is practically non-existent. Most epox are caught by sport-fishers; it is the largest fish in fresh waters, with the official record weight (in Swedish fresh waters) being 31 kg.

Gadiformes (cod-like fish)
The order Gadiformes includes many important food fish. For Sweden, the Atlantic cod Gadus morhua is in fact, together with the herring, the most important food fish. The catches of cod in Swedish waters are conducted both west of Sweden in the Skagerrak and east in the Baltic Sea. Cod in the Baltic does not migrate to the Atlantic, and has even been considered belonging to a separate species: Gadus morhua callarias, but this view is generally abandoned today.

The Baltic cod has been subjected to heavy fishing in the latest decades and is now endangered. Fishing stops have at times been called for, but the cod is of importance to many countries around the Baltic and is of such economical importance to a frigate of trawlers that a complete stop has not been carried through.

The Haddock (Melanogrammus aeglefinus) is another important food fish of Gadiformes. It is, in Swedish view, less important than the cod as it does not populate the Baltic. Like the cod it has been subjected to tough fishing to a degree that has diminished the population.

Burbot, the only fresh water fish of this order, is common in the whole of Sweden. It is the provincial fish of Västergötland in west Sweden.

Gasterosteiformes (pipefish or sticklebacks)
The most notable families of the order Gasterosteiformes are the sticklebacks. On the northern hemisphere, the three-spined stickleback (Gasterosteus aculeatus) is common in all oceans including the Swedish coasts, and in adjacent fresh water lakes and streams. It was once caught in large quantities to make fish oil; today it is still caught in some extent for the purpose of fish meal.

Lamniformes (makerell sharks)
The Lamniformes include some of the most familiar species of sharks, such as the great white shark. For this list, the Basking shark (Cetorhinus maximus) is of note, as it is the largest fish in Nordic water, occasionally encountered on the Swedish west coast (Västergötland). As the finds have become more sparse in recent years it is now listed as Endangered.

Myxiniformes
The Myxiniformes, or hagfish, are a family of primitive eel-like fish. They live in marine waters, and in Swedish waters they are encountered west of Sweden in the Skagerrak and Kattegat. It lacks economical importance as it is not eaten.

Lampriformes (seep sea ray finned fish) 
The Lampriformes are an order of primitive, often rope-like, fishes. Living in deep-sea in tropical and temperate waters, they are rarely encountered in Nordic waters.

Myctophiformes
The order Myctophiformes, which includes the family Myctophidae, or lanternfishes, consists of deep-sea fish common on the southern hemisphere and only rarely caught in Swedish waters.

Lophiiformes
The Lophiiformes, or angler fish, are deep-water fish with big heads. Of these, the Angler or Sea-Devil (Lophius piscatorius) is common in Sweden in the waters west of Sweden in the Skagerrak and Kattegat. It is a tasty fish and therefore common in the fish dishes, usually with its head removed. The Swedish catch in 1983 was 26 tonnes.

Mugiliformes

Osmeriformes 
The order Osmeriformes is generally encountered in the Atlantic Ocean as well as other oceans. A few species of the family Argentinidae extend their habitat to the Skagerrak where it is caught by Swedish ships. The catches are not food fish, but processed into fish meal.

Perciformes (perch-like fish)
The Perciformes include about 40% of all fish. The name Perciformes means perch-like.

One of the best known types is the Zander (gös in Swedish), commons and native in Sweden and indeed in most of Europe. It is a popular game fish because of its tastfulness. In Sweden it is common in all regions except the northernmost mountains and on the island Gotland, and it is the provincial fish of the province Västmanland. The Swedish record weight is 12.007 kg.

The arguably most popular fish in Swedish fresh water is the European perch, and the annual catch is around 2,000 tonnes. It is commons in the whole country—with the exception of the mountain regions in the north—and commonly encountered around the coast of the brackish Baltic Sea.

Petromyzontiformes (lampreys)
A lamprey is a jawless fish with a toothed, funnel-like sucking mouth, with which most species bore into the flesh of other fishes to suck their blood. In zoology, lampreys are not considered to be true fish because of their vastly different morphology and physiology.

In Sweden, the European river lamprey (Lampetra fluviatilis), living in fresh waters, is the most usual usage of the term lamprey. The Lampetra planeri is a closely related species living in small streams, possibly even the same species.

The lamprey is the provincial fish of Västerbotten in northern Sweden.

Pleuronectiformes (flatfish) 
The family of flatfish are common as food fish.

Some notable specimens are the Turbot which is common both on Sweden's east and west coasts. The Swedish catch was as much as 82 tonnes in the 1950s, but had decreased to 10–20 tonnes by the 1980s.

The Plaice (Pleuronectes platessa) is one of Sweden's most important food fishes. It is common around the shores on both the east and west coast. The catch in 1983 was 540 tonnes.

The Atlantic halibut (Hippoglossus hippoglossus) was also once a major food fish, but overfishing in recent decades has endangered the population in Swedish waters. The fish was in Sweden eaten during the weekends when meat was prohibited, which explains the Swedish name "Helgeflundra", literally "Holy Flounder".

Scorpaeniformes
The Scorpaeniformes are also known as mail-cheeked fishes due to their suborbital stay. Their head is armoured with bone plates. The families of this order are generally small, bottom living, and unsuited as food fish. As such, they lack commercial value.

An exception is the family Sebastidae, which contains appreciated food fish 
but as they are rare in Swedish waters they are not subjected to systematic fishing.

Of the family Triglidae, most species are uncommon in Swedish waters, but the small Chelidonichthys gurnardus (25–30 cm) has in recent decades attracted attentions as a food fish. It is common in both the Skagerrak and Kattegat, and the total amount of fish caught in 1983 was 9 tonnes.

Rajiformes 
The family of Rajiformes include ten families of ray-like fishes such as skates and stingrays.

Of the Rajiformes, three species are common in Nordic waters. The largest is the Blue skate, which is commons in the Skagerrak and Kattegatt west of Sweden but otherwise only sporadic. It is together with the Thumback ray (Raja clavata) the only cartilaginous fish of economical importance in Sweden.

Squaliformes (dogsharks)
Squaliformes is an order of sharks that includes the smooth dogfish and spiny dogfish. The most notable species here is the Greenland shark, Somniosus microcephalus, the second largest fish in Swedish waters.

Salmoniformes (salmon-like fish)
The Salmoniformes, salmon fish, are of important both as food fish but also as for sport fishers. For sport fishers, the salmon has the foremost position due to its strength and size. In popularity, it is followed by the Brown trout (Salmo trutta).

Salmons are usually native to the marine, but a notable exception is the lake population in lake Vänern. As the salmon requires access to its native birth places through the streams, it is sensitive to power stations and other modifications of the streams. As a result, the salmon population has become extinct in some areas, but by stocking fish the population has been upheld. However, the artificial cultivation of salmon has also led to the negative side effects of diseases that have further threatened the salmon population.

The Brown Trout is conveniently divided into three species: Marine, Lake, and Stream Trouts. It was previously thought that the three species were genetically different, but recent studies are now more in favour of attributing the differences to environmental differences. The marine population is endangered for the same reasons as the salmon, but in fresh water it is still common.

Stomiiformes (dragon-like fish) 
Fish of this order are deep-sea ray-finned fishes of very diverse morphology, including dragonfish, lightfish, marine hatchetfish and viperfish. Primarily residing in temperate waters they are uncommon in Swedish waters.

Siluriformes (catfish)
Siluriformes, or catfish, are a diverse order of fish distinguished by prominent "barbels", which give the image of cat-like whiskers. In Swedish waters, the only species of this order is the Wels catfish (Siluris glanis). This very large freshwater fish is common over much of continental Europe, and was once well known in Sweden. Today, its presence is only confirmed in the streams Helgeån, Emån and Båven.

Squatiniformes (angel sharks)
The order of angel sharks are uncommon in Nordic waters. A sporadic visitor is however the Angelshark (Squatina squatina), encountered on a few occasions between 1875 and 1961.

Tetraodontiformes
Tetraodontiformes are ray-finned fish, most of which are marine and dwell around tropical coral reefs. As such, they are only rarely encountered in Nordic waters. The large Sunfish (Mola mola) has however in recent decades been seen with more regularly in Swedish waters, almost on a yearly basis.

swedish fish
The order Zeiformes is best known for the dories. Generally not native in Nordic waters, but the John Dory (Zeus faber) became an occasional visitor around Swedish coasts by the late 19th century, and has in the latest decades been seen with annual regularity, although not in such quantities that systematical fishing of it is conducted. The fish is otherwise an attractive food fish in southern Europe and other parts of the world.

References

Resources 
Kullander, S.O. 2002. Svenska fiskar: Förteckning över svenska fiskar. World Wide Web elektronisk publikation; Naturhistoriska riksmuseet. https://web.archive.org/web/20050826044135/http://www2.nrm.se/ve/pisces/allfish.shtml.se
 English/Latin names of fishes
 Swedish Sportfishers: "Sportfishing official records in fresh waters -- [https://web.archive.org/web/20021214222009/http://www.sportfiskarna.se/storfiskregistreringen/sotvattenrekord.asp "Officiella rekord i svenska sötvatten]

 Literature 
 Gärdenfors, U. (red). 2005. Rödlistade arter i Sverige 2005. The 2005 Red List of Swedish species. Artdatabanken, Uppsala, 496 pp.
 Fries, B. Fr., C. U. Ekström & C. J. Sundewall. 1836-1857. Skandinaviens Fiskar. P.A. Norstedt & Söner, Stockholm, IV+222 ss. Appendix 1-44, 1-140, pl. 1-60.
 Kottelat, M. 1997. European freshwater fishes. An heuristic checklist of the freshwater fishes of Europe (exclusive of former USSR), with an introduction for non-systematists and comments on nomenclature and conservation.'' Biologia, Zool., 52, suppl. 5: 1-271.

Fauna of Sweden
Fish and chips
Sweden
Sweden